India and Hinduism has influenced many countries in other parts South Asia, East Asia and Southeast Asia as a result of commercial and cultural contacts. Ganesha is one of many Hindu deities who reached foreign lands as a result.

Ganesha was a deity particularly worshipped by traders and merchants, who went out of India for commercial ventures. The period from approximately the tenth century onwards was marked by the development of new networks of exchange, the formation of trade guilds, and a resurgence of money circulation, and it was during this time that Ganesha became the principal deity associated with traders. The earliest inscription where Ganesha is invoked before any other deity is by the merchant community.

Jainism
 
Ganesha is worshipped by only some Jainas, for whom he appears to have taken over certain functions of Kubera. Jaina connections with the trading community support the idea that Jainism took up the worship of Ganesha as a result of commercial connections.

The Jaina canonical literature does not mention Ganesha. The earliest literary reference to Ganesha in Jainism is in Abhidhāna chintāmani of Hemachandra (c.a. third quarter of twelfth century). It refers to several appellations of Ganesha such as Heramba,  and Vinayaka and visualizes him as elephant headed, pot-bellied, bearing an axe and riding a mouse.

According to the Swetambara Jaina work, Ācāradinakara of Vardhamānasūri (c. AD 1412), Ganapati is propitiated even by the gods to get desirable things. It is further mentioned that He is worshipped at the beginning of every auspicious ceremony and new project. This practice is still very common in the Swetambara community. The text provides procedures for the installation of Ganapati images.

The popularity is however not met with in Digambara texts. Excepting two medieval figures carved at Udayagiri and Khandagiri caves, Orissa and an early figure at Mathura, his representations are not found in any Digambara sites.

The earliest known Jaina Ganesha statue at Mathura with Jaina YakshiAmbika(the Jaina name for Gauri).[9] dates to about the 9th century AD.[10] Images of Ganesha appear in the Jaina temples of Rajasthan and Gujarat.[11] In the tenth-century Mahavir at Ghanerav and eleventh-century temple in Osian, Rajasthan; Ganesha images are found.

Buddhism
Ganesha also appears in Buddhism, not only in the form of the Buddhist god , but also portrayed as a Hindu deity form also called .  His image may be found on Buddhist sculptures of the late Gupta period.  As the Buddhist god , he is often shown dancing, a form called Nṛtta Ganapati that was popular in North India and adopted in Nepal and then into Tibet. A dancing Ganesha is evident in the Malay archipelago in the temple of Candi Sukuh.

Tibetan Buddhism

Tibetan representations of Ganesha show ambivalent views of him. In one Tibetan form he is shown being trodden under foot by Mahākala, a popular Tibetan deity.  Other depictions show him as the Destroyer of Obstacles, sometimes dancing.

Ganapati, Maha Rakta (Tibetan: ཚོགས་བདག tsog gi dag po, mar chen. English: The Great Red Lord of Hosts or Ganas) is a Tantric Buddhist form of Ganapati (Ganesha) related to the Chakrasamvara Cycle of Tantras. This form of Ganapati is regarded as an emanation of Avalokiteshvara.

"...beside a lapis lazuli rock mountain is a red lotus with eight petals, in the middle a blue rat expelling various jewels, [above] Shri Ganapati with a body red in colour, having an elephant face with sharp white tusks and possessing three eyes, black hair tied in a topknot with a wishing-gem and a red silk ribbon [all] in a bundle on the crown of the head. With twelve hands, the six right hold an axe, arrow, hook, vajra, sword and spear. The six left [hold] a pestle, bow, khatvanga, skullcup filled with blood, skullcup filled with human flesh and a shield together with a spear and banner. The peaceful right and left hands are signified by the vajra and skullcup filled with blood held to the heart. The remaining hands are displayed in a threatening manner. Wearing various silks as a lower garment and adorned with a variety of jewel ornaments, the left foot is extended in a dancing manner, standing in the middle of the bright rays of red flickering light." (Ngorchen Konchog Lhundrup, 1497–1557).

This form of Ganapati belongs to a set of three powerful deities known as the 'mar chen kor sum' or the Three Great Red Deities included in a larger set called 'The Thirteen Golden Dharmas' of Sakya. The other two deities are Kurukulle and Takkiraja.

In depictions of the six-armed protector Mahakala (Skt: Shad-bhuja Mahakala, Wylie: mGon po phyag drug pa), an elephant-headed figure usually addressed as Vinayaka is seen being trampled by the Dharma Protector, but he does not appear distressed. In Vajrayana and cognate Buddhist art, He is depicted as a subdued god trampled by Buddhist deities like Aparajita, Parnasabari and Vignataka.

The Tibetan Ganesha appears, besides bronzes, in the resplendent Thangka paintings alongside the Buddha. In "Ganesh, studies of an Asian God," edited by Robert L. BROWN, State University of New York Press, 1992, page 241–242, he wrote that in the Tibetan Ka'gyur tradition, it is said that the Buddha had taught the "Ganapati Hridaya Mantra" (or "Aryaganapatimantra") to disciple Ananda.

Japanese Buddhism

Vinayaka, the Buddhist equivalent to Ganesha, is known in Japanese as Shōten (聖天, lit. "sacred deva" or "noble deva"; alternatively Shōden) or Kangiten (歓喜天, "deva of bliss") and is worshiped mainly in the Shingon and Tendai schools.

Vinayaka's inclusion in the two primary mandalas of East Asian esoteric Buddhism (Tangmi) - brought to Japan from Tang China by Kūkai (774–835), the founder of Shingon Buddhism - facilitated his introduction to Japan, where he (like most other Hindu deities assimilated into Buddhism) was first considered a minor deity. By the Heian period (794–1185), an individualized cult centered around Vinayaka (as Shōten / Kangiten) emerged. He was then increasingly identified and conflated with a number of Buddhist and native Japanese deities, eventually being regarded in some texts in a henotheistic way as a kind of transcendent god who is the source of all the other gods. Although this development shares a number of parallels with the Hindu tradition of Ganapatya, it does not seem that Shōten benefited from a group whose members defined themselves exclusively as his worshipers as Ganesha did.

Although some traits are common to both Vinayaka (Shōten) and Ganesha, there are also some notable differences between the two. For instance, the Buddhist Vinayaka was originally negatively portrayed as the creator of obstacles and the leader of a horde (gaṇa) of obstructive demons called vinayakas; indeed, some legends portray him as originally being a malevolent demon king who was subjugated by the bodhisattva Avalokiteśvara (Kannon in Japanese), who took the form of a vinayaka demoness to tame and reform him. As Shōten grew in stature, however, he was increasingly disassociated from his vinayaka underlings, ultimately becoming regarded as a manifestation of the cosmic buddha Vairocana. Also, unlike his Hindu counterpart, whose image is prominently displayed and venerated in temples and homes, Shōten is regarded as a 'hidden' god too sacred to be seen: images of the deity in temples are permanently kept hidden from public view, rituals centered on him are performed in private by qualified monks, and lay devotees are discouraged from venerating iconographic depictions of the god at home.

Shōten is invoked both for enlightenment and for worldly gains - more for the latter than the former. Regarded as a god who grants all wishes (including impossible ones), he is widely worshiped for success in love, relationships, and business. He is usually offered daikon, sake, and a deep-fried sweet confection called Kangidan (歓喜団, "bliss bun"), which is based on the Indian modak, said to be a favorite of Ganesha.

Although he is sometimes depicted as an elephant-headed single male deity similar to Ganesha, he is more commonly portrayed as an embracing elephant-headed male-female couple in an iconographic depiction known as the Dual(-bodied) Kangiten (双身歓喜天, Sōshin Kangiten).

Buddha In Hinduism

Buddha as avatar of Ganesha 
Buddha appears as a name of Ganesha in the second verse of the Ganesha Purana version of the Ganesha Sahasranama. The positioning of this name at the beginning of the Ganesha Sahasranama indicates that the name was of importance to the authors of that scripture, who were Ganapatya Hindus.

Bhaskararaya's commentary on the Ganesha Sahasranama says that this name for Ganesha means that the Buddha was an incarnation (Avatar) of Ganesha. This interpretation is not widely known even among Ganapatya, and the Buddha is not mentioned in the lists of Ganesha's incarnations given in the main sections of the Ganesha Purana and Mudgala Purana. Bhaskararaya also provides a more general interpretation of this name as simply meaning that Ganesha's very form is "eternal enlightenment", so he is named Buddha.

Southeast Asia

Hindus spread through Maritime Southeast Asia and took their culture with them, including Ganesha, statues of whom are found throughout the region, often beside Shiva sanctuaries.  The forms of Ganesha found in Hindu art of Java, Bali, and Borneo show specific regional influences.  The gradual emigration of Hindus to Indochina established Ganesha in modified forms in Burma, Cambodia, and Thailand.  In Indochina Hinduism and Buddhism were practiced side by side, and mutual influences can be seen in Ganesha iconography of that region.

In Myanmar

The King of Brahmas called Arsi, lost a wager to the King of Devas, Śakra (Thagya Min), who decapitated Arsi as agreed but put the head of an elephant on the Brahma's body who then became Ganesha.

In Thailand

In Thailand, Ganesha is called Phra Phikanet (พระพิฆเนศ) or Phra Phikanesuan (พระพิฆเนศวร) and is worshipped as the deity of fortune and success, and the remover of obstacles. He is associated with arts, education and trade. Ganesha appears in the emblem of the Department of Fine Arts  in Thailand. Large television channels and production companies have shrines in his honour in front of their premises. Few movies or television shows begin shooting with a Hindu ritual in which prayers and offerings are made to Ganesha.
There are shrines to Ganesha across Thailand. One of the most revered shrines is the Royal Brahmin Temple in central Bangkok by the Giant Swing, where some of the oldest images can be found. Other old Ganesha images can be seen throughout Thailand, including a 10th-century bronze image found at Phang-Na with both Tamil and Thai inscriptions. The Hindu temple Wat Phra Sri Umadevi in Silom also houses a Ganesha image which was transported from India in the late 19th century.
Thai Buddhists frequently pay respect to Ganesha and other Hindu deities as a result of the overlapping Buddhist/Hindu cosmology.

He is honoured with Motaka, sweets and fruit, when business is good, and he is made ridiculous by putting his picture or statue upside down, when business is down. As lord of business and diplomacy, he sits on a high pedestal outside Bangkok's  CentralWorld (formerly World Trade Center), where people offer flowers, incense and a reverential sawasdee.

Another highly revered Ganesha shrine in Bangkok, is the Ganesha Shrine at the corner of Huai Khwang Intersection, the four-corners of Ratchadaphisek and Pracha Songkhro with Pracha Rat Bamphen Roads on the border between Din Daeng and Huai Khwang Districts.

This shrine was built in 2000 on the site of a former marble factory. It is popularly worshiped by both Thais and Chinese.

Chachoengsao is known as the "city of Ganesha in Thailand", with 3 huge Hindu-Buddhist deity Ganesha (Phra Phikanet or พระพิฆเนศ in thai language) statues in 3 different temples around Chachoengsao: 49 meters tall sitting Ganesha at "Phrong Akat Temple" which is the tallest sitting Ganesha in Thailand, 39 meters high standing Ganesha at "Khlong Khuean Ganesh International Park" which is the tallest standing Ganesha in Thailand, and 16 meters high and 22 meters long reclining Ganesha at "Saman Wattanaram Temple".

In Indonesia 

With regards to Indonesia, European scholars call him the 'Indonesian God of Wisdom'. Bandung boasts a Ganesha Street. A Ganesha statue from the 1st century AD was found on the summit of Mount Raksa in Panaitan Island, the Ujung Kulon National Park, West Java. An 11th-century AD Ganesha statue (seen in the picture below) was found in eastern Java, Kediri is placed in The Museum of Indian Art (Museum für Indische Kunst), Berlin-Dahlem. The 9th century statue of Ganesha resides in western cella (room) of Prambanan Hindu temple.

Ganesha is also featured in reliefs from Cambodian temples.

Speculation related to Janus

In 1785, William Jones drew a close comparison between a particular form of Ganesha, known as Dwimukhi-Ganesha, and Janus, the two-headed Roman god.  Jones felt the resemblance between Dwimukhi-Ganesha and Janus was so strong that he referred to Ganesha as the "Janus of India." The Dwimukhi-Ganesha form is a very unusual depiction in which Ganesha is shown with the head of an elephant looking toward his right and a human head at his left. It was possessed of four arms. Nagar says that the Dwimukhi-Ganesha form was associated with the region around Bombay.

This speculation was repeated by Volney in his Meditation on the Revolutions of Empires (1791), in which he noted the phonetic similarity between the names "Ganesha" and "Janus" and both gods' association with beginnings; and by Moor in The Hindu Pantheon (1810).  Moor expanded the claims of an association based on functional grounds, noting that Janus, like Ganesha, was invoked at the beginning of undertakings, a liminal god who was the guardian of gates. Moor made various other speculations on the connection between Janus and Ganesha.  These fanciful connections proposed by early Indologists no longer appear in modern academic reviews of Ganesha's history.

Ganesha is represented as having anywhere from one to five heads, so depictions with two heads are not reliable evidence of a connection with Janus.  Representations of Ganesha with two heads are uncommon, and according to Nagar, textual references to the adoration of Ganesha with two heads are difficult to trace.  There are no other examples of two-headed forms in which one head is human other than the Dwimukhi-Ganesha form.  In the thirty-two mediation forms of Ganesha that are described in the Sritattvanidhi only one has two heads (Dwimukhi Ganapati, the Ganapati with two faces), and both of those are heads of elephants, like all the other forms described.

Notes

References
Brown, Robert L. Ganesh: Studies of an Asian God (State University of New York: Albany 1991). .  A collection of studies.
Chapter 8: Brown, Robert L..  "Gaņeśa in Southeast Asian Art: Indian Connections and Indigenous Developments".
Chapter 10: Lancaster, Lewis. "Gaņeśa in China: Methods for Transforming the Demoniac".
Chapter 11:  Sanford, James H.  "Literary Aspects of Japan's Dual-Gaņeśa Cult".
Getty, Alice. Gaņeśa: A Monograph on the Elephant-Faced God. (Clarendon Press: Oxford, 1936).  1992 reprint edition, . Individual chapters are devoted to individual countries and regions of the world.
Krishan, Yuvraj. Gaņeśa: Unravelling An Enigma. (Motilal Banarsidass Publishers: Delhi, 1999) .  Chapter XVI. "Gaņeśa Beyond India's Frontiers".
Martin-Dubost, Paul. Gaņeśa: The Enchanter of the Three Worlds. (Project for Indian Cultural Studies: Mumbai, 1997). . Appendix III: The Expansion.
Nagar, Shanti Lal. The Cult of Vinayaka. (Intellectual Publishing House: New Delhi, 1992). .  Chapter 17: "The Travels Abroad".
Pal, Pratapaditya. Ganesh: The Benevolent. (Marg Publications: 1995) .  A collection of studies, well-illustrated, with broad geographic range.
Michael Wright Ganesha: The Great Hihdu God in India and Southeast Asia (Matichon 2006) .

External links
India and Japan

World Religions
Buddhism and Hinduism
Hinduism and other religions